EOLIAN INSTATE is the first release by patten following the announcement of signing to Warp Records in 2013.

The release was of 500 physical copies.

Track listing

References

2013 EPs
Warp (record label) EPs